Anne Sellies (born 16 June 2000) is a Dutch footballer who plays as a forward for ADO Den Haag in the Eredivisie.

Personal life
Sellies was born in Zutphen.

References

Living people
Dutch women's footballers
Eredivisie (women) players
2000 births
Women's association footballers not categorized by position
ADO Den Haag (women) players